Fernando Palomeque Díaz (born March 20, 1968, in Mexico City) is a former Mexican football player and current manager of Herediano.

External links
Liga MX 

1968 births
Living people
Footballers from Mexico City
Mexican football managers
Mexican footballers
Association football goalkeepers